Liran Shoshan, better known by his stage name Lyrik (in Hebrew ליריק), is an Israeli music producer, songwriter and singer born in Jerusalem. He is founder of the production house Lyrik Productions. He has cooperated with renowned international DJs and producers like Tiësto, Paul Oakenfold and was signed by their labels "Black Hole" and "Perfecto". Lyrik has also worked with many Israeli artists, most notably Sarit Hadad, Michal Amdurski, Assaf Gad Hanun and Yeho. His productions include mainly electro sounds and trance music.

He has a long-time collaboration with Israeli artist Yeho producing many of the latter's albums, most notably My Turn in 2009 and Yeho in 2013. The two also toured together the United States in their joint "Remember When Tour". Lyrik also appears frequently in Yeho's music videos and has released many remixes of Yeho's songs. In 2012, Lyrik signed with the European dance label Golden Globe and is currently working with Yehon on the artist's third full length English album due out in winter 2014.

Partial discography 
"Across the Universe" (Yeho and Lyrik)
"Leh" (Yeho and Lyrik)
"Over Emotion" (Lyrik feat. Natali)

References

External links 
Lyrik Productions Facebook
Lyrik Music YouTube page

Israeli record producers
20th-century Israeli male singers
Israeli male songwriters
Musicians from Jerusalem